The 6 Hours of Nürburgring (formerly the Nürburgring 1000 km) was an endurance race for sports cars held on the Nürburgring in Germany and organized by the ADAC since 1953.

History 
On the traditional 22.810 km long Nordschleife ("Northern Loop") version, the competition took usually 44 laps (1003.64 km, since 1967 1004.74 km) and lasted about eight hours, later less than six hours. While the 1974 event was shortened in the wake of the oil crisis, the 1976 race was extended by 3 laps and covered 1073.245 km.

The inaugural race, which counted towards the 1953 World Sportscar Championship, was won by Alberto Ascari and Giuseppe Farina in a Ferrari. The attendance at this inaugural event was disappointing, blamed in part on the lack of a serious German entrant. As a result, once it became clear that the Mercedes-Benz 300 SLR would not be ready in time for the 1954 event the race was cancelled. The 1955 event suffered the same fate, but this time cancelled in the aftermath of the 1955 Le Mans disaster. It became quite popular in the 1960s and 1970s though, and even more so after Formula One decided not to race at the Nürburgring after 1976 on safety grounds.

The last race on the Northern Loop in 1983 was won by Jochen Mass and Jacky Ickx in their Rothmans Porsche 956. In that year, due to the ongoing construction work, the track had been shorted to 20.832 km and provisional pits were used. This event saw the fastest ever timed lap of the Nordschleife when German driver Stefan Bellof lapped his Rothmans Porsche in 6:11.13 during practice, and an average of over 200 km/h. Bellof also set the race lap record during that race lapping in 6:25.91.

Since 1984, the 1000 km races were run on the new, much shorter Grand-Prix-Strecke, while the 24 Hours Nürburgring stayed on the legendary long track. In 1991, the 1000 km races were first shortened to 480 km, then discontinued overall due to the demise of the World Sportscar Championship.

In 2000, the 1000 km were resumed, with new competitive cars of BMW and Audi. The race was held as a part of the European Le Mans Series (ELMS), the European version of the American Le Mans Series (ALMS). In a wet race, the unusual front-engined Panoz of Jan Magnussen and David Brabham won, ahead of a BMW V12 LMR, an Audi R8 and the second Panoz.

On September 4, 2005, the 1000 km was held as a part of the Le Mans Endurance Series (LMES).

The 500 km Nürburgring was also similar event for smaller sportscars during the 1960s and 1970s.

VLN also runs a six-hour endurance race, while covering only 4h in other heats. In 2010, for the first time a distance of more than 1000 km was covered by the winning Porsche 911 GT3.

Current record of most wins belongs to Stirling Moss who won the race in 1956, 1958, 1959 and 1960.

In 2010, the winning Porsche 911 GT3 R of the 6h ADAC Ruhr-Pokal-Rennen race was the first to cover more than 1000 km in a 6-hour VLN endurance race for GT3 and touring cars, lapping the 24,369 km long modern version of the Nordschleife 42 times for 1023.498 km in a time of 6:06:56.091. The 2012 winner, a Mercedes-Benz SLS AMG GT3, covered the same distance in a time of only 6:01:29.541, at an average of 169.879 km/h.

As a part of the Oldtimer Festival in 2010 the tradition and name of the renowned ADAC 1000 km of Nürburgring will be continued by the motor sport club DAMC 05. In contrast to former years, the race is organised for older cars and therefore the term “classic” was added to the name.

The 2013 race was the first under the Blancpain Endurance Series banner of the Stephane Ratel Organisation.

Winners

1 – 1974 Race scheduled for 750 km only

2 – 1981 Race stopped after 17 laps due to fatal accident of Herbert Müller which caused track damage

3 – 1986 Race was stopped due to torrential rain and only ran approximately 600 km.

4 – Time limit reached before 1,000 km distance was completed (six hours for the Le Mans Series and Blancpain Endurance Series races, the 2010 Oldtimers Festival race had a seven-hour time limit).

Gallery

References

External links 

 Official Website
 Le Mans Series – 2007 1000 km of Nürburgring
 Story and Photos 1966-1970 (German)
 Story and Photos of 2000 (German)
 Story and Photos of 2004 (German)

 
Recurring sporting events established in 1953